The Barcelona Science Park ("", abbreviated as PCB) is a scientific park located in the city of Barcelona, Spain.

History 
The facility was began operations in 1997. In 2019, PCB  incorporated a private investor and planned to open 10 new laboratories. Some of the facilities are not expected to open until 2025.

Tenants of the PBC include the Institute of Molecular Biology of Barcelona, the Institute for Research in Biomedicine, the National Center for Genomic Analysis (CNAG-CRG), Qiagen, Evonik Industries and Pharmacelera.

References 

University of Barcelona
Science parks in Catalonia
Science parks in Spain
Research institutes in Catalonia
Economy of Barcelona
Buildings and structures in Barcelona